The Hubble Space Telescope is a telescope in low Earth orbit. 

Hubble may also refer to:

Astronomy
 Hubble sequence, a classification of galaxy types
 Hubble's law, a statement in physical cosmology
 Hubble (crater), a lunar crater
 2069 Hubble, a main-belt asteroid

People
 Edwin Hubble, an astronomer born in 1889
 Hubble (surname), a surname and list of people with the surname

Places
 Hubble, Kentucky
 Hubble Township, Cape Girardeau County, Missouri
 Hubble Creek (Castor River Diversion Channel), a stream in Missouri
 Hubble Creek (St. Francis River), a stream in Missouri

Other uses
 Hubble (film), a 2010 documentary film about the telescope
 Hubble Connected or Hubble, a subsidiary of Binatone
 Hubble (climbing route), a famous climbing route

See also
 Edwin Hubble House, a historic house in San Marino, California, US
 Hubbell (disambiguation)